Lye is a caustic chemical.

Lye may also refer to:
Lye, West Midlands, a small town in England
Lye, Indre, a commune of the Indre département in France
Lye railway station, in England whose National Rail station code is LYE
RAF Lyneham, a former Royal Air Force station in Wiltshire, England whose IATA code is LYE

People:
Edward Lye (1694–1767), English scholar
Len Lye (1901–1980), New Zealand-born artist
James Lye, Singaporean actor
Kåre Arnstein Lye (1940–2021), Norwegian botanist.